The Prayer of Consecration to the Sacred Heart of Jesus is a Roman Catholic prayer composed by Pope Leo XIII. It was included in the 1899 encyclical Annum sacrum issued by Leo XIII as he consecrated the entire world to the Sacred Heart of Jesus.

The consecration was influenced by two letters written to the pope by Sister Mary of the Divine Heart Droste zu Vischering who stated that in visions of Jesus Christ she had been told to request the consecration.

Words of the prayer

Most sweet Jesus, Redeemer of the human race, look down upon us humbly prostrate before Thine altar. We are Thine, and Thine we wish to be; but, to be more surely united with Thee, behold each one of us freely consecrates himself today to Thy most Sacred Heart. 

Many indeed have never known Thee; many too, despising Thy precepts, have rejected Thee. Have mercy on them all, most merciful Jesus, and draw them to Thy sacred Heart. 

Be Thou King, O Lord, not only of the faithful who have never forsaken Thee, but also of the prodigal children who have abandoned Thee; grant that they may quickly return to Thy Father's house lest they die of wretchedness and hunger. 

Be Thou King of those who are deceived by erroneous opinions, or whom discord keeps aloof, and call them back to the harbor of truth and unity of faith, so that there may be but one flock and one Shepherd. 

Be Thou King of all those who are still involved in the darkness of idolatry and refuse not to draw them into the light and kingdom of God. Turn Thine eyes of mercy towards the children of the race, once Thy chosen people: of old they called down upon themselves the Blood of the Savior; may it now descend upon them a laver of redemption and of life. 

Grant, O Lord, to Thy Church assurance of freedom and immunity from harm; give peace and order to all nations, and make the earth resound from pole to pole with one cry: "Praise be to the divine Heart that wrought our salvation; to it be glory and honor for ever." Amen.

See also
 Act of Consecration to the Sacred Heart of Jesus
 Act of Reparation to the Sacred Heart of Jesus
 Alliance of the Hearts of Jesus and Mary

Notes

Sources
 Ann Ball, 2003 Encyclopedia of Catholic Devotions and Practices  page 166 

Roman Catholic prayers